The president of Turkey is the highest authority of the Republic of Turkey, serving as the nation's head of state and head of government. There have been twelve heads of state since the inception of the republican period in 1923, following the Turkish War of Independence. For a list of rulers of the predecessor Ottoman Empire, see List of sultans of the Ottoman Empire.

List of presidents

Timeline

See also
Acting President of Turkey
President of Turkey
Vice President of Turkey
Çankaya Mansion
Presidential Complex
Presidential Guard Regiment (Turkey)
History of Turkish presidential elections

References

External links
Past presidents, Presidency of the Republic of Turkey.

List
Presidents
Turkey
Heads of state of Turkey